Kolaras is a town and a nagar parishad in Shivpuri district in the Indian state of Madhya Pradesh. Kolaras is located on NH3 (Agra bomabay highway) presently called NH46. It is religious city and famous with name mini vrindavan.

Geography
It has an average elevation of 460 metres (1,509 feet).

Demographics
 India census, Kolaras had a population of 15,674. Males constitute 53% of the population and females 47%. Kolaras has an average literacy rate of 58%, lower than the national average of 59.5%: male literacy is 67%, and female literacy is 47%. In Kolaras, 17% of the population is under 6 years of age.

Transport
Kolaras railway station is situated at Kolaras town on Indore–Gwalior line under the Bhopal railway division.

References

Shivpuri